The women's 100 metre backstroke event at the 2000 Summer Olympics took place on 17–18 September at the Sydney International Aquatic Centre in Sydney, Australia.

At only 16 years of age, Diana Mocanu made an Olympic milestone to become Romania's first ever gold medalist in swimming. She fought off a head-to-head sprint challenge from Japan's Mai Nakamura on the final stretch to hit the wall first in a new Olympic standard of 1:00.21, the second-fastest of all time, cutting off Krisztina Egerszegi's 1992 record by nearly half a second (0.50). Meanwhile, Nakamura seized off an early lead under a world-record pace (29.17), but ended up only with a silver medal in a Japanese record of 1:00.55. Competing previously for the Unified Team and Russia in two Olympics (1992 and 1996), Nina Zhivanevskaya made a surprise packet with a bronze for Spain in a sterling time of 1:00.89.

France's Roxana Maracineanu finished off the podium in fourth place at 1:01.10, and was followed in fifth by Nakamura's teammate Noriko Inada in 1:01.14. Coming from second at the final turn, U.S. swimmer Barbara Bedford faded down the stretch to pick up the sixth spot with a time of 1:01.47. Aussie favorite Dyana Calub (1:01.61) and Denmark's Louise Ørnstedt (1:02.02) closed out the field.

Notable swimmers missed out the top 8 final, featuring Germany's Antje Buschschulte, a pre-Olympic medal contender; South Africa's Charlene Wittstock, who eventually married to Albert II, Prince of Monaco in 2010; and Zimbabwe's Kirsty Coventry, who later emerged as one of the world's top backstroke swimmers in her decade.

Records
Prior to this competition, the existing world and Olympic records were as follows.

The following new world and Olympic records were set during this competition.

Results

Heats

Semifinals

Semifinal 1

Semifinal 2

Final

* Also a European and a Romanian record.

References

External links
Official Olympic Report

B
2000 in women's swimming
Women's events at the 2000 Summer Olympics